Ryan P. Aument (born December 16, 1976) is an American politician and Republican member of the Pennsylvania State Senate for the 36th district. Prior to his election to the State Senate in 2014, he served as a member of the Pennsylvania House of Representatives, for the 41st District, which includes portions of Lancaster County.

Political career
Ryan entered public service as the Lancaster County Clerk of Courts, the 56th individual to hold this position. In November 2010, Aument defeated Gerald E. Policoff in the general election to succeed Katie True. Aument sponsored teacher evaluation legislation in his first term. The bill was ultimately signed into law as Act No. 82 in the 2011–2012 legislative session. In November 2012, Aument defeated Marcy Dubroff and retained his house seat.

In the 2014 election, Aument ran for retiring Mike Brubaker's seat in the State Senate. He defeated Gordon Denlinger in the Republican primary, then defeated Democrat Gary J. Schrekengost in the general election.

On Feb 9th 2021, Aument was chosen by Governor Tom Wolf to be a part of the bipartisan COVID-19 taskforce. As a part of this task force, Aument oversaw the establishment of a mass-vaccination clinic in his home county of Lancaster at the Park City Center in conjunction with local hospitals and Lancaster county commissioner Joshua Parsons.

Aument is an opponent of abortion rights. He has voted for numerous restrictions on abortion services since the beginning of his time in the Pennsylvania House of Representatives in 2011 to his present position in the Pennsylvania Senate.

Aument is an opponent of LGBT rights. In 2022, he co-sponsored and voted twice in favor of a bill banning transgender girls from participating on female sports teams. Also in 2022, he was the sponsor of the variant of a "Don't Say Gay" bill in the Pennsylvania Senate, which would forbid any discussion of sexual/romantic orientation or of gender identity in Pennsylvania elementary schools.

Aument opposes the use of ballot drop boxes in elections, saying in 2022, "it has become abundantly clear that drop boxes are the least secure way to vote in Pennsylvania."

Committee assignments 

 Consumer Protection & Professional Licensure, Vice Chair
 Appropriations
 Communications & Technology
 Education
 Environmental Resources & Energy 
 Judiciary
 Local Government
 Rules & Executive Nominations

Military career
Ryan served as a captain in the United States Army during Operation Iraqi Freedom, briefly commanding an infantry company of 150 soldiers after his company commander was wounded in action. He also served on battalion staff as a Civil Affairs officer. During his military career, Ryan earned several awards, including the Bronze Star Medal, Army Commendation Medal, Army Achievement Medal and Army Parachutist Badge. He graduated from The Citadel, the Military College of South Carolina, in 1999.

References

External links
State Sen. Ryan Aument official caucus website
Elect Aument campaign website
Profile on the Pennsylvania House of Representatives website

1976 births
Living people
United States Army personnel of the Iraq War
The Citadel, The Military College of South Carolina alumni
Republican Party members of the Pennsylvania House of Representatives
Republican Party Pennsylvania state senators
People from Lancaster County, Pennsylvania
United States Army officers
21st-century American politicians